The following is the final results of the 1995 World Wrestling Championships. Men's Freestyle Competition were held in Atlanta, Georgia, United States. Men's Greco-Roman Competition were held in Prague, Czech Republic and Women's Competition were held in Moscow, Russia.

Medal table

Team ranking

Medal summary

Men's freestyle

Men's Greco-Roman

Women's freestyle

References
Freestyle Results
Women Results
Greco-Roman Results

External links
UWW Database

World Wrestling Championships
W
W
W
W
International wrestling competitions hosted by the United States
W
Sports competitions in Atlanta
Sports competitions in Prague
Sports competitions in Moscow
1995 in Moscow
International wrestling competitions hosted by Russia
Wrestling in the Czech Republic
World Wrestling Championships
1995 in Atlanta
1990s in Prague
August 1995 sports events in the United States
September 1995 sports events in Europe
October 1995 sports events in Europe